is a city located in Rumoi Subprefecture, Hokkaido, Japan. It is the capital of Rumoi Subprefecture.

As of September 2016, the city has an estimated population of 22,242 and the density of 75 persons per km2. The total area is 297.44 km2.

History
Rumoi was developed by herring fishery and mining.
1869: Rurumoppe was renamed Rumoi.
1877: The village of Rumoi was founded.
1902: The villages of Rumoi and Reuke were merged to form Rumoi Village.
1907: Sandomari village was merged into Rumoi village.
1908: Rumoi village became Rumoi town.
1914: The capital of Mashike Subprefecture was transferred from Mashike to Rumoi and Mashike Subprefecture was renamed Rumoi Subprefecture.
1919: Obirashibe village (now Obira town) was split off.
1945 Rumoi was designated as the site of the proposed Soviet invasion of Hokkaido, with a plan to occupy the island from Rumoi in the west to Kushiro in the east. The plan was cancelled.
1947: Rumoi town became Rumoi city.

Geography
Rumoi is located in the south of Rumoi Subprefecture. Rumoi River flows through the city.

Climate
Rumoi has a humid continental climate (Köppen climate classification Dfb) with warm summers and cold winters. Precipitation is significant throughout the year, but is heaviest from August to December.

Average wind speed by month
()

Transportation

Rail
Rumoi is at the end of the JR Hokkaido Rumoi Main Line.

Stations in Rumoi: Tōgeshita - Horonuka - Fujiyama - Ōwada - Rumoi

The stations of Segoshi and Reuke closed on 4 December 2016.

Road
 Fukagawa-Rumoi Expressway

Sea
 Port of Rumoi

Education

High school
 Hokkaido Rumoi High School

Junior high school
 Rumoi junior high school
 Kounan junior high school

Mascot 

She is a 25-year-old kind herring egg who has 1 daughter named .

Sister city
 Ulan-Ude, Buryatia, Russia (since 5 July 1972)

References

External links 

 Official Website 

Cities in Hokkaido
Port settlements in Japan
Populated coastal places in Japan